Kearney Catholic High School is a private, Roman Catholic high school in Kearney, Nebraska, United States.  It is located in the Roman Catholic Diocese of Grand Island.

Background
Kearney Catholic High School was founded in 1961, as the first Catholic high school in Kearney. The school was dedicated by Bishop John Paschang on October 18, 1961, at first offering grades 7-10. A grade was added each year following, with the first graduating class of 1964 consisting of 22 students. The school now offers classes in grades 6 to 12, and is a member of the Centennial Conference, after leaving the Louplatte Conference in 2018. The school is accredited by the North Central Association of Colleges and Schools.

Financial support for the school comes from tuition, support from the St. James and Prince of Peace parishes, and the Kearney Catholic Foundation.

NSAA enrollment figures for grades 9-11 (used for activity classification):

Extracurricular activities

Athletics
Kearney Catholic athletic programs compete as a member of the Nebraska School Activities Association. Various athletic programs have won the following NSAA state championships:
 Boys' football - none (runner-up - 2011)
 Girls' golf - 2008
 Boys' basketball - 2004
 Boys' cross country - 1998, 1999
 Boys' track and field - 1986
 Girls' basketball - 1984, 1985, 2007, 2015, 2016 (runner-up - 2002, 2013)
 Girls' volleyball - 2012, 2013, 2014, 2015 (runner-up - 1985, 2010, 2011)
 Girls' tennis - 1978, 1979
 Girls' track and field - 1999
 Girls' cheerleading (runner-up - 2011)

References

External links
 School website

Roman Catholic Diocese of Grand Island
Catholic secondary schools in Nebraska
Schools in Buffalo County, Nebraska
Educational institutions established in 1961
1961 establishments in Nebraska
Buildings and structures in Kearney, Nebraska